Rhosneigr railway station serves the village of Rhosneigr on the isle of Anglesey, off the coast of north Wales. The unstaffed station is managed by Transport for Wales Rail, who also operate all trains that serve it.

History
The station was opened in May 1907, much later than the other Anglesey stations on the North Wales Coast Line. It was closed between 1 January 1917 and 1 February 1919 as an economy measure during World War I. Unlike the other stations it has neither sidings or a goods yard. The station buildings were originally made of wood but in 1953 they were replaced by concrete structures. Of these, the structure on platform one remains whilst the one on platform two has been replaced by a metal and plastic bus stop-style shelter. The station master's house still stands but is a private dwelling.

Facilities
There are no ticketing facilities of any kind here, so tickets must be bought prior to travel or on the train.  The station does though have digital CIS displays to provide train running information, along with a pay phone and timetable poster boards.  Although there is step-free access to each side, the paths to each platform are steep and not made up, so are unsuitable for wheelchair users.

Services 

There is a roughly two-hourly weekday service in each direction from the station (with some extra morning and evening trains), plus a limited Sunday service (six to Holyhead, seven toward Chester). Trains stop on request.

References

Further reading

External links 

Railway stations in Anglesey
DfT Category F2 stations
Former London and North Western Railway stations
Railway stations in Great Britain opened in 1907
Railway stations in Great Britain closed in 1917
Railway stations in Great Britain opened in 1919
Railway stations served by Transport for Wales Rail
Railway request stops in Great Britain
Llanfaelog